Captain Price is a character in the Call of Duty video game franchise.

Captain Price or Capt. Price may also refer to:

People
 Anthony Price (1928–2019), British author and army captain
 Charles Price (Royalist) (died 1645), Welsh soldier and politician
 David Price (East India Company officer) (1762–1835), Welsh orientalist and officer in the East India Company army
 David Price (Royal Navy officer) (1790–1854), Royal Navy officer
 Ernest B. Price (1890–1973), American diplomat, university professor, military officer and businessman
 George Edward Price (1842–1926), Royal Navy officer and politician
 Henry Bertram Price (1869–1941), U.S. Navy officer
 Richard Price (Wales MP) (fl. 1653), Welsh politician and Parliamentary army officer
 Thomas Phillips Price (1844–1932), Welsh landowner, politician and Militia officer
 William Price (RAF officer) (1895–1982), World War I flying ace
 William Edwin Price (1841–1886), English politician and Militia officer

Characters
 Captain Marian Price, a Doctor Who character

See also
 Price (surname)